Alec Empire vs. Elvis Presley is a recording by Alec Empire which incorporates Elvis Presley samples.

The recording 
Empire recorded vs. Elvis in 1998 after returning home to Berlin from a tour of the United States with his band Atari Teenage Riot. As a method of escape from the digital hardcore sound he became interested in Presley, watching all of his movies. Inspired, he collected two hours' worth of samples and mixed them in his own particular style, the result of which caused his girlfriend at the time to leave him.

The release 
Originally intended for release on his DHR Limited label, Empire ran into problems when attempting to release the album as the Elvis samples were used without permission from the Presley Foundation. Concerned at the prospect of legal action Empire decided not to release vs. Elvis on DHR, and instead pressed a few copies for friends and DJs. In a record store in New York in 1999, Empire to his surprise discovered a vinyl copy of the recording that had been pressed by El Turco Loco ("The Mad Turk"), an obscure label owned by former Matador Records artist Khan.

The album is long out of print, but copies have occasionally been sold on eBay, as well as exchanged in MP3 format on p2p networks. Since the release is a bootleg, the track listing of the recording seems to in the incorrect order (i.e. the song "Last Message From The Soul" seems to be an introduction track) and back cover claims to be "recorded in the highest quality" but the sound is very poor. This recording also marks the end of Alec Empire's usuage of the popular drum sample the Amen break, as he stated in interviews that it had been done to death and was using similar fashion to Presley's death on this album.

The album has been made available for purchase as a digital download in the Hellish Vortex Online Shop.

A video was made for the track "You Ain't Nothing" by Empire's friend and collaborator Philipp "Virus" Reichenheim (link).

Track listing

Notes

External links 
 Alec Empire vs. Elvis Presley LP at Discogs

1999 albums
Alec Empire albums